The Cascades Rapids (sometimes called Cascade Falls or Cascades of the Columbia) were an area of rapids along North America's Columbia River, between the U.S. states of Washington and Oregon.
These rapids or cascades, along with the many cascades along the Columbia River Gorge in this area of Oregon and Washington, gave rise to the name for the surrounding mountains: the Cascade Range.

In 1896 the Cascade Locks and Canal were constructed to bypass the rapids. In the late 1930s, the construction of the Bonneville Dam led to the submerging of the rapids and most of the 1896 structures.

Fishing site
The rapids were an important fishing site for Native Americans, who would catch salmon as they swam upriver to spawn.

Obstacle on Oregon Trail

They also posed a major obstacle to the development of the Oregon Trail; initially, pioneers would gather at The Dalles to await small boats to carry them to the Willamette Valley; in 1845, Sam Barlow and his associates built a road around the south side of Mount Hood, which allowed travelers along the Trail to bypass the rapids on the last leg of their journeys.

Boat portage
Boat travelers were required to either portage boats and supplies or pull boats up with ropes.

Conflicts over portage rights
Conflicts continued thereafter between the Chinookan natives and Europeans and Americans, who generally refused to recognize the natives' authority over passage through the area. By 1813–14, fur traders passing through were resorting to violent force against the Indians. Although more diplomatic approaches eventually prevailed, a malaria outbreak in the 1830s so reduced the populations of the Cascade and other Indian tribes, that they ceased to be a powerful force along the river.

However, three forts, Fort Cascades, Fort Raines and Fort Lugenbeel were constructed between present day Stevenson, Washington and North Bonneville over 1855–6 to protect the portage road around the rapids.  Natives burned Fort Cascades in 1856, but it was rebuilt.  This attack prompted the construction of Fort Lugenbeel.

Steamboat navigation

The Cascades were a significant barrier to river navigation. Steamboats could not go upriver through the rapids, and could be brought downriver only at great risk, although this was done a number of times by highly skilled captains.  A canal and lock around the rapids was completed in 1896 at what is now Cascade Locks, Oregon. By 1938 the rapids were gone, submerged under the Bonneville Reservoir as it formed behind Bonneville Dam. Bonneville Lock at the dam, completed in 1937, replaced the old Cascade Locks around the rapids.

See also
 Bridge of the Gods, a land bridge formed by the Bonneville Slide several hundred years ago
 Bridge River Rapids, a similar fishing site on the Fraser River
 Cascade Locks and Canal, the first navigation locks built around the rapids, before the construction of Bonneville Dam
 Celilo Falls, a more significant former fishing site and economic hub upstream of the gorge
 Fort Cascades
 Greenleaf Peak
 Kettle Falls, in Washington
 Priest Rapids, another fishing site in eastern Washington
 Table Mountain
 List of rapids of the Columbia River

References

External links

 
 

Columbia River Gorge
History of transportation in Oregon
History of transportation in Washington (state)
Native American history of Oregon
Native American history of Washington (state)
Landforms of Skamania County, Washington
Rivers of Hood River County, Oregon
Rapids of the United States
Rivers of Oregon
Rivers of Washington (state)
Submerged waterfalls